James Andrew Haley (January 4, 1899 – August 6, 1981) was a U.S. Representative from Florida.

Born in Jacksonville, Alabama, Haley attended the public schools and the University of Alabama. During World War I, Haley enlisted in the United States Army serving with Troop A, Second Cavalry where he saw combat in France, in April 1917 and served overseas. He was an accountant in Sarasota, Florida, from 1920 to 1933. He served as general manager of John Ringling estate 1933–1943.

On December 4, 1942, Haley married Aubrey Ringling (née Aubrey Barlow Black), the widow of Richard T. Ringling who had died in 1931. Richard Ringling was the son of Alf T. Ringling one of the original Ringling brothers.

From 1943 to 1945, he was the first vice president of Ringling Circus and president and director of Ringling Bros. and Barnum & Bailey. In 1944, a fire broke out at a Ringling Circus show in Hartford, Connecticut that killed 169 people. On the day of the fire, Haley was the highest ranking executive traveling with the circus. During the subsequent trial, he and five other circus officials pleaded no contest to charges of involuntary manslaughter and were sentenced to prison. Haley served eight months and in 1945 was returned to Florida, where he received a pardon from Governor Millard F. Caldwell.

Haley worked for Ringling Bros. and Barnum & Bailey from 1946 to 1948. He later engaged in newspaper publishing and later in general printing business. He served as chairman of the Democratic executive committee of Sarasota County 1935–1952. He served as member of the Florida House of Representatives from 1949 to 1952. He was a delegate to the 1952, 1956, and 1960 Democratic National Conventions.

Haley was elected as a Democrat to the Eighty-third and to the eleven succeeding Congresses (January 3, 1953 – January 3, 1977), during which time he was a signatory to the 1956 Southern Manifesto that opposed the desegregation of public schools ordered by the Supreme Court in Brown v. Board of Education. He served as chairman of the Committee on Interior and Insular Affairs (Ninety-third and Ninety-fourth Congresses).

Haley was not a candidate for reelection to the Ninety-fifth Congress in 1976.

Haley died in Sarasota on August 6, 1981, and was interred in Boca Raton Cemetery in Boca Raton. The United States Department of Veterans Affairs located in Tampa is named James A. Haley VA Medical Center after him.

References

1899 births
1981 deaths
20th-century American businesspeople
20th-century American politicians
American accountants
United States Army personnel of World War I
American segregationists
American prisoners and detainees
American people convicted of manslaughter
Democratic Party members of the Florida House of Representatives
Democratic Party members of the United States House of Representatives from Florida
Recipients of American gubernatorial pardons
Ringling Bros. and Barnum & Bailey Circus people
People from Jacksonville, Alabama
People from Sarasota, Florida
United States Army soldiers
University of Alabama alumni
Prisoners and detainees of Connecticut